Toogood is a surname. Notable people with the surname include:

 Alfred Toogood (1872–1928), English golfer
 Charlie Toogood (1927–1997), American football player
 Faye Toogood (born 1977), British designer
 Giles Toogood (born 1961), English cricketer
 Jon Toogood (born 1971), frontman of New Zealand rock band Shihad
 Laura Toogood (born 1984), British writer, academic and equestrian
 Peter Toogood (1930–2019), Australian golfer
 Selwyn Toogood (1916–2001), New Zealand radio and television personality
 Ted Toogood (1924–2011), Canadian football player
 Thomas Toogood (1872–1953), English cricketer
 Walter Toogood (1874–1914), English golfer

See also 
 Mount Toogood, a mountain of Victoria Land, Antarctica

References 

English-language surnames